St. Ignatius Church is a Catholic church of the Archdiocese of Washington located at 2315 Brinkley Rd., Fort Washington, MD 20744, in Oxon Hill, Prince George's County, Maryland.

Building 
The historic church structure was constructed between 1890 and 1891. The -story structure is wood frame, with clapboarding, and shingling in imbricated pattern. It is rectangular in form with a gabled roof,  projecting front belfry with spire and louvered openings, round arched openings, and modified corner buttresses. The architectural style is considered Eclectic, with elements of the Shingle and Queen Anne styles.

History 
It is the second church on site and has served as a mission and parish church. The original church, built in 1849, was partially funded by Mary Surratt, one of the conspirators involved with the Assassination of Abraham Lincoln. It was later staffed by the Josephites, a religious society serving African Americans.

The present church was listed on the National Register of Historic Places in 1974.

St. Luke's Catholic Church entered into a shared community arrangement at the historic building as of September 2019. Under the agreement between the Archdiocese of Washington and the Personal Ordinariate of the Chair of Saint Peter, the pastor of St. Luke's also serves as administrator of St. Ignatius. The principal Sunday Mass and masses during the week are now celebrated according to the Ordinariate's Anglican Use liturgy with the Divine Worship: The Missal. Masses Saturday evening and early Sunday morning continue to be celebrated in the Ordinary Form of the Roman Missal. Details of the schedule are at the parish websites referenced below.

References

External links

, including photo in 1972, at Maryland Historical Trust website
St. Ignatius Parish website
St. Luke's at Ignatius Church Parish website
Historical Marker Database, St. Ignatius marker

Churches in Prince George's County, Maryland
Churches on the National Register of Historic Places in Maryland
Roman Catholic churches in Maryland
Roman Catholic churches completed in 1891
19th-century Roman Catholic church buildings in the United States
Shingle Style church buildings
Queen Anne architecture in Maryland
Historic American Buildings Survey in Maryland
National Register of Historic Places in Prince George's County, Maryland
Oxon Hill, Maryland
Churches of the Personal Ordinariate of the Chair of Saint Peter
Shingle Style architecture in Maryland
1891 establishments in Maryland